Elio Pagliarani (25 May 1927 – 8 March 2012) was an Italian poet and literary critic, who belonged to the avant-garde Gruppo 63 movement. He was born in Viserba, near Rimini.

Pagliarani graduated in Politics Science at Padua, and in the 1940s he moved to Milan where he worked as a journalist and as a teacher. In the 1960 he moved to Rome. In the 1950 he worked for L'Avanti! and, from 1968, as theatre critic for Paese Sera.

His most renowned work is the experimental poem "La ragazza Carla", published in 1960. Pagliarani's poems usually deal with realist themes, such as work, economics, and the lower classes.

In 1971 he founded the magazine Periodo Ipotetico, and later he also worked for Nuova Corrente. Starting in 1988 he was editor-in-chief of the poetry magazine VIDEOR. La ballata di Rudi won the Viareggio Prize for poetry in 1995.  He died in Rome in 2012, aged 84.

Works
Cronache e altre poesie (1954)
Inventario privato (1959)
La ragazza Carla e altre poesie (1962) (The Girl Carla and Other Poems. New York: Agincourt Press, 2009.)
Lezione di fisica  (1964)
Pelle d'asino (1964, play)
 Lezione di fisica e fecaloro (1968)
Doppio trittico di Nandi (1977)
Epigrammi ferraresi  (1988)
La ballata di Rudi  (1995)

References

External links
Short biography 
"News item: Italian Poet Elio Pagliarani (1927–2012)", ArtsEditor.com

1927 births
2012 deaths
Gruppo 63
Italian journalists
Italian male journalists
Italian male poets
People from Rimini
20th-century Italian poets
20th-century Italian male writers